Kumluca (formerly: Kocanos) is a town (belde) and municipality in the Ulus District, Bartın Province, Turkey. Its population is 2,064 (2021). It is situated along the Kocanaz River.

References

Populated places in Bartın Province
Towns in Turkey
Ulus District